Errenteria is a town located in the province of Gipuzkoa in the Basque Autonomous Community, in the north of Spain, near the French border. The river Oiartzun cuts its way through the town, one that has undergone severe pollution up to recent times on its lower stage.

History 
The town was founded in 1320, during the reign of Alfonso XI of Castile, with the name of Villanueva de Oiarso or Oyarço. It soon started to be known as La Rentería because it hosted the office where iron export taxes were collected (taxes were called rentas reales i.e. royal rents in medieval Castile). 

The Basque form Errenteria (also Errenteri o Errenderi) started to appear towards the end of the 16th century. In 1998, the town hall decided to use Errenteria as the only official name. 

In September 1982, Rentería was the scene of the bloodiest ETA attack of that year.

Districts
Agustinak/Agustinas
Alaberga
Beraun
Kaputxinoak/Capuchinos
Etxe Berriak/Casas Nuevas
Gaztaño
Erdialdea/Centro
Fanderia
Gabierrota
Galtzaraborda
Iztieta
Lartzabal
Listorreta
Olibet–Ugarritze
Ondartxo
Perurena
Pontika
Zamalbide

Twin towns
Errenteria is twinned with:
 Lousada, Portugal
 Tulle, France
 Schorndorf, Germany

References

External links
 Official website 
 ERRENTERIA in the Bernardo Estornés Lasa - Auñamendi Encyclopedia (Euskomedia Fundazioa) 

Municipalities in Gipuzkoa